Louisiana Public Library is a historic Carnegie library building located at Louisiana, Pike County, Missouri. It was designed by the architectural firm Mauran, Russell & Garden and built in 1905.  It is a one-story, Late Gothic Revival style rock-faced, cut limestone building on a partially exposed basement.  It measures approximately 50 feet by 40 feet and features a front arched doorway with batten doors, eyebrow windows, and stepped parapet.  It was constructed with a $10,000 grant from the Carnegie Foundation.

It was listed on the National Register of Historic Places in 1996.  It is located in the North Third Street Historic District.

External links
 Libraries.org

References

Individually listed contributing properties to historic districts on the National Register in Missouri
Carnegie libraries in Missouri
Libraries on the National Register of Historic Places in Missouri
Gothic Revival architecture in Missouri
Library buildings completed in 1905
Buildings and structures in Pike County, Missouri
National Register of Historic Places in Pike County, Missouri
1905 establishments in Louisiana